Homoeodera scolytoides is a species of beetle belonging to the family Anthribidae.

References

Beetles described in 1972
Anthribidae